Maike is a given name. Notable people with the given name include:

Maike Arlt (born 1963), German volleyball player
Maike Becker (born 1962), German handball player
Maike Evers (born 1980), Australian real estate professional and television personality
Maike Kohl-Richter (born 1964), the second wife of former German Chancellor Helmut Kohl 
Maike van Niekerk, Canadian activist and entrepreneur
Maike Nollen (born 1977), German sprint canoer
Maike Schaunig (born 1996), German field hockey player
Maike Schirmer (born 1990), German handball player
Maike Stöckel (born 1984), German field hockey player